The Red One is a studio album by American R&B and Boogie-woogie pianist and vocalist Little Willie Littlefield.

Content
The album was recorded in June 1997 at The Farmsound Studio in Heelsum in the Netherlands and released in 1998 on the Dutch record label Oldie Blues (OLCD 7005). The album was produced by Martin van Olderen.

Track listing
 "Here We Go Again"
 "Willie's Boogie Woogie Blues"
 "I Wonder"
 "Sea Cruise"
 "The Red One"
 "Drifting Blues"
 "Get Your Kicks on Route 66"
 "Boogie Woogie Jam"
 "Blues at Sunrise"
 "Caldonia"
 "Wooden Heart Boogie"
 "Rhumba Blues"
 "Tribute to the Count"
 "Piano Roll Blues"
 "Down by the Riverside"
 "Little Willie's Boogie"
 "Thunder and Rumble"
 "Call Him Mr. Blues"
 "Chief's 40 Years Anniversary  "Oldie'Blues" Boogie"

Personnel
 Little Willie Littlefield - piano, vocals
 Tony Littlefield - vocals
 Rob Langereis - bass
 Louis Debij - drums
 Job Zomer, Huub Jacobs - tenor sax

References

Little Willie Littlefield albums
Oldie Blues albums
1998 albums